is a Japanese speed skater. He competed at the 1984 Winter Olympics and the 1988 Winter Olympics.

References

1963 births
Living people
Japanese male speed skaters
Olympic speed skaters of Japan
Speed skaters at the 1984 Winter Olympics
Speed skaters at the 1988 Winter Olympics
Sportspeople from Hokkaido
Speed skaters at the 1986 Asian Winter Games